Brownber is a hamlet surrounding Brownber Hall near Newbiggin-on-Lune in Cumbria, England.

Hamlets in Cumbria
Ravenstonedale